Johan Persson may refer to:

 Johan Persson (photographer) (born 1982), Swedish photographer
 Johan Persson (footballer) (born 1984), Swedish footballer
 Johan Persson (ice hockey) (born 1990), Swedish ice hockey player
 Johan Abram Persson (1898–1971), Swedish cross-country skier, fisherman, craftsman and wolfhunter